KK Blokotehna  is a Macedonian basketball club that was based in Gevgelija, North Macedonia. Established in 2016, they played in the Macedonian First League. After winning the BIBL in its second season, the team was dissolved in 2019.

History

The club was founded in 2016, but it sent their players on loan to Radoviš in the Macedonian Second League. After Radoviš secured a place in the First League, with mutual agreement he transferred his place to Blokotehna. In the season 2017/2018 Blokotehna applied for participation in BIBL. Тhey were eliminated in the semifinals by Levski Lukoil. On April 7, 2019, Blokotehna won for the first time in the history BIBL League trophy beating in the Final Teuta. In season 2018/19 they were hosts of the domestic cup and they played in the Final against Rabotnicki. They made it to the semi-finals in the domestic Championship.

BIBL League Seasons 
 2018: (10-4) 4th 
 2019: (11-3) 2nd

Honours
European 
BIBL Champions 2019

Notable players

 Danilo Mijatović
 Anton Kazarnovski
 Dwayne Benjamin
 Shakir Smith
 Cedrick Bowen
 Marjan Mladenović
 Goran Glavčev
 Stojan Gjuroski

Notable coaches
 Marjan Ilievski

References

External links
 Eurobasket.com KK Blokotehna Page
 BlokoTechna from Gevgelija to join the SIGAL UNIQA Balkan League anniversary edition
 KK Blokotehna BIBL Profile

Basketball teams in North Macedonia
Gevgelija Municipality
Balkan International Basketball League
Basketball teams established in 2017